Peptidyl-prolyl cis-trans isomerase-like 4 is an enzyme that in humans is encoded by the PPIL4 gene.

This gene is a member of the cyclophilin family of peptidylprolyl isomerases. The cyclophilins are a highly conserved family, members of which play an important role in protein folding, immunosuppression by cyclosporin A, and infection of HIV-1 virions.

References

Further reading